Evedon is a village in the North Kesteven district of Lincolnshire, England.

Parish population in 1881 was 73, with Murray Finch-Hatton DL JP as sole landowner. The parish was entitled to send children to Sleaford Grammar School, and two to the Free School at Ewerby. The parish register dates from 1599. There were still three farms, with two farm bailiffs, and a dairyman. The nearest money order and telephone office was at Ewerby.

The former civil parish of Evedon was amalgamated in 1931 with that of Ewerby, to form Ewerby and Evedon civil parish.

The parish church, dedicated to Saint Mary, is a Grade II* listed building dating from the 13th century and restored in 1898, and built of limestone.

Evedon Manor House, once the seat of the Bertie family, is a Grade II listed 16th-century house built from limestone, with 19th-century alterations.

References

External links

Villages in Lincolnshire
North Kesteven District
Former civil parishes in Lincolnshire